A sung-through (also through-sung) musical, musical film, opera, or other work of performance art is one in which songs entirely or almost entirely replace any spoken dialogue. Conversations, speeches, and musings are communicated musically, for example through a combination of recitative, aria, and arioso. Early versions of this include the Italian genre of opera buffa, a light-hearted form of opera that gained prominence in the 1750s.

A through-sung opera or other form of narrative work with continuous music may also be described as through-composed.

List of fully sung-through musicals 

 Art Thief Musical!
 Bare: A Pop Opera
 Bumblescratch
 Cats
 Une chambre en ville
 Cricket
 Les Dix Commandements
 Evening-1910
 Evita
 Falsettos
 Hamilton: An American Musical (sung-and-rapped-through)
 The Human Comedy
 Jesus Christ Superstar
 Johanna
 Joseph and the Amazing Technicolor Dreamcoat
 Keating!
 Katy! the Musical
 King David
 The Last 5 Years
 Marry Me a Little
 Metalocalypse: The Doomstar Requiem
 Les Misérables
 Miss Saigon
 Murder Ballad
 Natasha, Pierre & the Great Comet of 1812
 Notre-Dame de Paris
 Ordinary Days
 Quadrophenia
 Repo! The Genetic Opera
 Song and Dance
 Songs for a New World
 Starlight Express
 Starmania
 Tell Me on a Sunday
 The Ten Commandments: The Musical
 The Umbrellas of Cherbourg

List of sung-through musicals with scattered lines  

 Ain't Misbehavin'
 American Idiot
 Annette
 Aspects of Love
 Caroline or Change
 Come from Away
 Dance of the Vampires
 Elisabeth
 The Golden Apple
 Hadestown
 In Trousers
 Jekyll & Hyde
 Jerry Springer: The Opera
 John & Jen
 Love Never Dies
 Martin Guerre
 The Most Happy Fella
 A New Brain
 Next to Normal
 Once on This Island
 Parade
 Passing Strange
 The Phantom of the Opera
 Pink Floyd—The Wall 
 The Pirate Queen
 Ragtime
 Razia's Shadow
 Rent
 Seussical
 Sgt. Pepper's Lonely Hearts Club Band
 Side Show
 Soon 
 The Stingiest Man in Town
 Sunset Boulevard
 Superhero 
 The Who's Tommy
 The Woman in White

List of sung-through musicals depending on the production
 Chess
 Originally starting off as a concept album, the musical has a reputation for being re-written during every new production that is staged around the world. Some productions are completely sung-through, some have scattered lines, and some (notably the original Broadway production) are staged as book musicals.
 Jacques Brel is Alive and Well and Living in Paris

References